Phalaenopsis stuartiana is a species of orchid endemic to the island of Mindanao, in the Philippines.

External links 
 
 

stuartiana
Orchids of the Philippines